Simonetta is an Italian surname and female given. Notable people with the name include:

Given name
Simonetta Moro, Italian fine artist
Simonetta Puccini (1929–2017)
Simonetta Greggio, Italian novelist who writes in French
Simonetta Paloscia, Italian engineer
Simonetta Stefanelli (born 1954), Italian actress, born in Rome, Italy
Simonetta Vespucci (1453–1476), the wife of the Italian nobleman Marco Vespucci of Florence
Simonetta Di Pippo, Italian astrophysicist
Simonetta Lein, American model
Simonetta Sommaruga, Swiss politician

Surname
Cicco Simonetta (1410–1480), Italian secretary, statesman and cryptographer
Ada Sacchi Simonetta (1874–1944), Italian librarian
Umberto Simonetta (1926–1998), Italian playwright, writer and lyricist
Francesco Simonetta, Roman Catholic prelate

See also
29706 Simonetta, a main-belt asteroid

Italian feminine given names
Italian-language surnames